The 1951 Grand Prix motorcycle racing season was the third F.I.M. Road Racing World Championship Grand Prix season. The season consisted of eight Grand Prix races in five classes: 500cc, 350cc, 250cc, 125cc and Sidecars 500cc. It began on 8 April, with Spanish Grand Prix and ended with Nations Grand Prix on 9 September. As of 2022, this is the most recent season the premier class was won by a non-Japanese or non-Italian constructor.

1951 Grand Prix season calendar

† The race saw only four competitors and was not counted as a round of the World Championship.

Standings

Scoring system
Points were awarded to the top six finishers in each race. Only the best three races counted in the Sidecars, 125cc and 250cc, while in the 350cc and 500cc championships, the best five results counted.

500cc final standings

Constructors' 500cc World Championship

350cc Standings

250cc Standings

125cc Standings

References
 Büla, Maurice & Schertenleib, Jean-Claude (2001). Continental Circus 1949–2000. Chronosports S.A. 

Grand Prix motorcycle racing seasons
Grand Prix motorcycle racing season